The Mini Lop is a breed of domestic rabbit that is recognized by the American Rabbit Breeders Association (ARBA). It is different from the Miniature Lop breed that is recognized by the British Rabbit Council (BRC). (In the UK, the Miniature Lop is sometimes called—for short—the "Mini Lop".) The Mini Lop [US] and the Miniature Lop [UK] are different from the Dwarf Lop breed that is recognized by the BRC (but not ARBA). The Mini Lop is similar to several other small rabbit breeds, such as the Dwarf rabbit.

History
Bob Herschbach discovered the Mini Lop breed at a German National Rabbit Show in Essen, Germany in 1972, where it was known as a Klein Widder. These first Mini Lops were originated from the German Big Lop and the small Chinchilla. These two breeds came originally in Agouti and white colors.

Herschbach, a Mini Lop promoter, achieved the first procreation of Mini Lops in the United States, mainly through breeding an agouti lop pair and a white female lop in 1972. Their first baby lops were solid colors. A second generation came with broken colors. As a result of the breeding process, they began to obtain a high standard of qualities Mini Lop.

In 1974, Herschbach's Mini Lop rabbits made their debut in an American Rabbit Breeders' Association (ARBA) convention held in Ventura, California. The outcome was that the breed needed to be downsized to a more compact, attractive size. In order to achieve this, Herschbach enlisted the assistance of other breeders by letting them breed more of his Mini Lops. One final touch resulted in changing the breed name from Klein Widders to "Mini Lop" to make it more appealing to the public.

In 1977 the Mini Lop breed was under new sponsorship; Herb Dyke was the person in charge of this task.

In 1978, Herschbach and Dyke created a correspondence club for the Mini Lops. Within a year, they had over 500 members who had contacted the ARBA with support for the Mini Lop rabbit.
In 1980, in Milwaukee, Wisconsin at the National Rabbit Convention, this breed marked its success when it was recognized as an official rabbit breed sanctioned by ARBA.

Shortly after, the Mini Lop Club of America was founded to promote it.

Showing Mini Lops
The ideal Mini Lop is described as being a "basketball with a head". Judges like to see a nice rounded body with thick depth, long thick ears, a wide head and thick bone.

ARBA Accepted Colors

When showing Mini Lops the colors are broken down into two categories; Solids and Brokens. There are many colors available in this breed however only certain colors are accepted. Some of these colors are:

Chinchilla, Chestnut Agouti, Lynx, Opal, Black, White, Ruby-Eyed White, Blue-Eyed White, Blue, Chocolate, Lilac, Orange, Tri Color

Mini Lop Standard of Perfection

Schedule of points according to the ARBA Standard of Perfection:

General Type                    80
Body                 43
Head                 20
Ears and crown       12
Feet, Legs & Bone      5
Fur                             10
Color & Markings                 5
Condition                        5

Weight Limits and showroom classes according to ARBA's Standard of Perfection:

Senior Bucks- 6 months of age and older, weight 
Senior Does- 6 months of age and older, weight 
Junior Bucks and Does- Under 6 months, weight 

The Mini Lop rabbit is classified as a medium-sized rabbit. The various colors within a variety are not judged separately. They are divided for judging into two groups, classifications, solid and broken pattern.

General Type: When viewing the Mini Lop, one should see a rabbit that gives the general appearance of a massive, thick set, heavily muscled body. The animal should have a good balance of width and depth, allowing for a slight taper from the heavier hindquarters to the shoulders. There should be a good top line starting at the base of the skull and rising over the spine, with the peak over the center of the hips. The hips should be smooth, deep, well rounded and full in the lower hips.
Faults: Long narrow body, chopped or undercut in the hips, and flat shoulders or hips.

Head: The head of the Mini Lop Rabbit should have strong and bold features. The head is to be set closely on the shoulders, with the neck as short as possible. The crown of the head is very boldly arched. There is a slight curvature of the skull from the base of the crown down towards the nose. The head should appear to be wide and have a well filled muzzle. The size of the head should balance with the body. Buck heads are usually wider than doe heads.

Faults: Long narrow head, pointed nose, concave or flat crown.

Ears: The ears of the Mini Lop carry as many points as the head. The ears should rise from a strong base ridge and then loop vertically on both sides of the head, thus giving a horseshoe appearance. The ears should lie close to the cheeks, with the ear openings turned toward the head. The ears should be well furred and rounded on the ends.

Faults: Poor ear carriage, folds in ear, extremely thin or thick ears, and ears turning away from the head.

Legs & Feet: Legs are important for good type. They should be straight, short, and thick. Toenail pigmentation can be either light or dark in the broken group. The front and rear nails may vary in color, but all front toenails must match and all rear toenails must match. Faults: Unmatched nails in broken colors.

Disqualifications: General toenail disqualifications apply on all solid pattern groups.

Fur: The Mini Lop fur is very thick and dense. It should be glossy and lustrous. It is medium in length with a good roll back.

Faults: Long, thin, silky, harsh or extremely short fur.

Color: Mini Lops come in many beautiful colors. When making a selection of stock, color really should be the last consideration before making your choice. Type should always be considered first. When judging, color points are divided equally between color and markings. The broken pattern includes any recognized color group in conjunction with white. A butterfly marking on the nose with wings outlined in white is preferred with colored eye circles and both ears colored. The body should have either a blanket or patched markings. Front feet should be white and rear feet may be white. Solid pattern includes any recognized color group.

Faults: Lacking complete head markings, light body markings, and excessive white hairs in a solid pattern.

Eyes: They may be any color, but must match each other.

Disqualifications: Eyes that do not match. Foreign color spots in rabbits of the solid pattern group.

See also

List of rabbit breeds
Dwarf rabbit
House rabbit
Lop rabbit

References

Animal-World: Mini Lop Rabbits
Mini Lop Care
Mini Lop Rabbit Club of America

Further reading

External links

American Rabbit Breeder's Association
Mini Lop Rabbit Club of America
Mini Lop Rabbit Breed History
Rabbit Breeds Listing

Rabbits as pets
Lop rabbits
Rabbit breeds originating in the United States

fr:Nain bélier
fi:Kääpiöluppakani